is a retired judoka who competed in the -78 kg and -86 kg divisions.

Biography
Okada began judo in primary school, and won the inter-highschool light heavyweight judo tournament in 1984. While attending the University of Tsukuba, he won the Jigoro Kano Cup in 1986 and the All-Japan Judo Championships in 1987 and 1988, followed with a gold medal in the -78 kg division of the World Judo Championships in 1987. This earned him a spot on the Japanese olympic judo team for the 1988 Summer Olympics, but he was unable to win a medal after a loss in the third round of the tournament.

Okada joined the Marunaka corporation in 1990, and continued his graduate studies at the University of Tsukuba until 1993. In 1990, he moved up in weight to win the -86 kg divisions of the Kodokan Cup and Asian Games. He also won the All-Japan Championships for three consecutive years from 1990–1992, and won another gold medal at the World Judo Championships in 1991. He made his second trip to the Summer Olympics in 1992, and finished with a bronze medal.

Okada won the Kodokan Cup again in 1992 before facing Yoshio Nakamura in the 1994 All-Japan Championships. Nakamura caught Okada in a complete Ude-Hishigi-Juji-Gatame midway through the match, but Okada refused to tap out, forcing the referee to call time. As a result, Okada seriously injured his left arm, suffering a torn ligament and a dislocation. The match ended in a yusei loss for Okada.

Okada won another international competition in Germany before announcing his retirement in December 1995. He has worked as a judo instructor for the University of Tsukuba after retiring, and has appeared as a color commentator for NHK's judo broadcasts.

See also
List of judoka
List of Olympic medalists in judo

References

External links
 

1967 births
Living people
Japanese male judoka
Judoka at the 1992 Summer Olympics
Judoka at the 1988 Summer Olympics
Olympic judoka of Japan
Olympic bronze medalists for Japan
Sportspeople from Gifu Prefecture
University of Tsukuba alumni
Olympic medalists in judo
Asian Games medalists in judo
Judoka at the 1990 Asian Games
Medalists at the 1992 Summer Olympics
Asian Games gold medalists for Japan
Medalists at the 1990 Asian Games
Goodwill Games medalists in judo
Competitors at the 1990 Goodwill Games